The Iran–Turkmenistan Friendship Dam or Doosti Reservoir Dam is a dam on the Hari River (Hariroud), which forms part of the international boundary between Iran and Turkmenistan (Iran-Turkmenistan border). The dam was completed in 2004, and both countries agreed that each would have an equal right to the waters of the river, which amount to 820 million cubic metres. It was officially opened on 12 April 2005. The dam provides drinking water and irrigation for the surrounding areas along with hydroelectric power.

See also 

Syria–Turkey Friendship Dam
List of dams and reservoirs in Iran

Notes

Dams in Iran
Dams in Turkmenistan
Iran–Turkmenistan border
Dams completed in 2005
Hydroelectric power stations in Iran
Hydroelectric power stations in Turkmenistan
Earth-filled dams
Iran–Turkmenistan relations